Anton Werner Lignell (1867–1954) was a Swedish-speaking Finnish architect known for designing buildings in Butte, Montana; Duluth, Minnesota; and two courthouses in Minnesota.

Biography 
Lignell was born to skipper Pehr Anton Lignell and Ingeborg Ahlstedt in Mariehamn, Åland, Finland, in 1867. In his early 20s, in 1888, he emigrated to Butte, Montana, founding the Anaconda Copper Mining Company Employees Club there. He was in a partnership with architect William Pole White in Butte from 1897 to 1902, designing St. Paul's Methodist Episcopal Church and other buildings.

In 1903, he moved to Duluth, Minnesota, where he formed a partnership with Canadian architect Frederick German in 1905. Together the two would design a number of residences in Duluth's East End mansion district as well as important buildings in the city, including the YMCA building, the YWCA building, the Duluth Curling Club building, and Glen Avon Presbyterian Church. Homes he designed in Duluth include a large Flemish-style house at 202 North 24th Avenue East for Swedish immigrants Gust and Hanna Carlson and the Craftsman-style William and Margrette Cole residence at 2204 East 1st Street. In 1906, Lignell and German were hired to draw the plans for the school, Villa Sancta Scholastica Academy, and the motherhouse at the College of St. Scholastica. Mother Scholastica Kerst disapproved of the plans due to potential defects in the building's design, and the two architects were fired from the project in 1908; it was taken over by Franklin Ellerbe.

Lignell partnered with Clyde Wetmore Kelly in 1911, designing the Cook County Courthouse in Grand Marais, Minnesota. Together with Robert Loebeck, he designed the Roseau County Courthouse in Roseau, Minnesota, in 1913. Both courthouses are listed on the National Register of Historic Places.

Architect Thomas J. Shefchik, designer of the Duluth City Hall, started his architectural career as a draftsman for Lignell and Kelly.

Lignell worked as an architect until the late 1930s. He spent the last years of his life in Oahu, Hawaii, where he died in 1954.

Work

With Frederick German 

 Clara M. Smith residence (1903)
 A. C. Weiss residence (1904)
 Glen Avon Presbyterian Church (1905)
 Luther Mendenhall houses (1905)
 Duluth Yacht Club, Oatka Beach Building (1906)
 Marvin Memorial Building (c. 1906)
 Freimuth Building (1907)
 First Street Department Store (c. 1907)
 Donald B. McDonald residence (1908)
 YMCA building (1908)
 William and Margrette Cole residence (1908)
 YWCA building (1909)
 Duluth Marine Supply Building (1912)
 West Duluth Independent Order of Odd Fellows Hall (1911)

With Clyde Wetmore Kelly 

 Cook County Courthouse (1911)

With Robert Loebeck 

 Roseau County Courthouse (1913)

See also 

 Oliver G. Traphagen – Duluth-based architect

References 

1867 births
1954 deaths
19th-century American architects
19th-century Finnish architects
20th-century American architects
20th-century Finnish architects
Swedish-speaking Finns
People from Mariehamn